Stéphane Zubar (born 9 October 1986) is a Guadeloupean footballer who plays as a defender for  club A.F.C. Totton. He is the younger brother of Ronald Zubar and cousin of Claude Dielna, both of them being footballers.

Zubar began his career at Caen, but never made a first-team appearance and was released from the club after spells on loan at Championnat National club Pau and Belgian First Division club Brussels. He spent the 2009–10 season with Romanian Liga I club Vaslui, where he experienced European football after helping the club to the 2010 Cupa României Final. Zubar signed with English club Plymouth Argyle in November 2010, and moved on to AFC Bournemouth in September 2011. He was loaned out to Bury in January 2013 and to Port Vale in September 2014. He joined League Two club York City in November 2014, where he played for the rest of 2014–15. Zubar returned to York on loan in August 2015, but returned to Bournemouth after he suffered a cruciate ligament injury. He joined Weymouth on non-contract terms in August 2016, before returning to full-time professional football with Yeovil Town in June 2017, but after suffering another knee injury left without making an appearance. He returned to Weymouth and helped the club to two successive promotions: winning the Southern League Premier Division South title in 2018–19 and the National League South play-offs in 2020, before joining A.F.C. Totton via Gosport Borough in October 2020.

Club career

Caen
Born in Pointe-à-Pitre, Guadeloupe, Zubar began his career with Caen at the start of the 2003–04 season, following in the footsteps of his older brother Ronald. He signed a three-year professional contract with Caen in the summer of 2006. He spent time on loan with Championnat National club Pau in 2007 and Belgian First Division club Brussels in 2008, but did not make a first-team appearance for Caen.

Vaslui
Zubar was transferred to Romanian Liga I club Vaslui in 2009, where he made his debut for the club in a 1–1 draw against Steaua București on 27 February. He scored his first goal for the "Yellow-Greens" in a 2–2 draw with Brașov at the Municipal. He helped the club to finish third in Liga I and reach the final of the Cupa României during 2009–10, where Zubar was not used in the substitute bench, only to lose to Cluj 5–4 on penalties in the final.

Plymouth Argyle
He joined English League One club Plymouth Argyle on a trial during the summer of 2010, following a recommendation from Mick McCarthy. His trial at Plymouth was successful and he signed for club after international clearance was granted on 16 November. He made his debut four days later as the "Pilgrims" lost 2–1 to Brentford at Home Park. Initially played at rght-0back, he went on to form a successful centre-back partnership with Curtis Nelson. On 28 December, Zubar scored his first goal in England as Plymouth drew 1–1 with Notts County. Seven days later he scored his second goal for Plymouth in a 3–2 win over Bristol Rovers. On 11 January 2012, Zubar received a red card after a second bookable offence in a 3–2 defeat to Huddersfield Town. At the end of 2010–11 Argyle were relegated to League Two and Zubar was the only player to be offered a new (two-year) contract by a club, which he signed in July. However he had his contract with the club terminated at the end of August, citing "personal reasons"; club chairman Peter Ridsdale said that "Stephane will remain a friend of the club and leaves with our best wishes".

AFC Bournemouth
In September 2011, Zubar joined AFC Bournemouth on a free transfer, signing a one-year contract with the option for a second, having spent time with the club on trial. He made his League One debut for the club on 24 September in a 2–1 defeat to Hartlepool United at Dean Court. He scored an own goal on 25 October which cost the "Cherries" two points in a 1–1 draw at Colchester United. On 12 November, Zubar scored his first goal for Bournemouth in a 3–3 draw with Gillingham in the FA Cup. Some impressive performance for the club kept him in the first team at the expense of Adam Barrett and led manager Lee Bradbury to offer him a new three-and-a-half-year contract, which was signed in February 2012.

He fell out of favour under new manager Eddie Howe, and signed for Kevin Blackwell's Bury on loan until the end of 2012–13 on 24 January 2013. Howe agreed to loan Zubar out to league rivals as he felt he needed to get game time in order to "get his career back on track". Despite only playing six games for the "Shakers" Blackwell said that the Gigg Lane faithful had appreciated Zubar's contribution and "have become massive Zubar fans". However he picked up an anterior cruciate knee injury in March and was ruled out of action for nine months. Bournemouth were promoted to the Championship at the end of 2012–13, and the higher standard of football and his injury effectively ruled him out of action throughout 2013–14. He was expected to join Bury on a free transfer in July 2013, but a deal was never completed.

Zubar had a trial with Crewe Alexandra in September 2014. He joined League One club Port Vale on a one-month loan on 29 September. He made three appearances for the "Valiants", and was sent off in the last of these games for striking out at Preston North End's Joe Garner in a 2–0 defeat at Deepdale. He did not return to the starting line-up and manager Rob Page elected not to extend his loan spell at Vale Park. Zubar instead joined Russ Wilcox's York City on a two-month loan. The loan was extended to the end of 2014–15 and he impressed in his performances at Bootham Crescent enough to warrant speculation in the local press that he would be offered a contract by York in the summer.

Despite having not played for Bournemouth for more than two-and-a-half years, the club's promotion to the Premier League in May 2015 triggered a one-year extension to his contract. Zubar rejoined York on a one-month loan on 7 August 2015, and made his debut a day later in a 3–0 away defeat to Wycombe Wanderers, the opening match of 2015–16. He suffered cruciate ligament damage during York's 0–0 away draw with Exeter City on 22 August 2015, which was expected to rule him out for the season. He returned to Bournemouth for treatment, ending his loan at York on five appearances.

Weymouth
Zubar had a trial with Dundee United, playing two closed-door friendlies in June and July 2016. He joined Southern League Premier Division club Weymouth on non-contract terms in August 2016. He made 46 appearances across the 2016–17 season, scoring five goals.

Yeovil Town
On 28 June 2017, Zubar joined League Two club Yeovil Town on a one-year contract. After failing to make a competitive appearance due to injury Zubar was released by Yeovil, on 8 August 2017.

Later career
Having recovered from his knee injury Zubar returned to Southern League Premier Division club Weymouth in November 2017, and made his second debut for the Terras in a 2–0 victory over Biggleswade Town. Weymouth ended the season in fifth-place, losing to King's Lynn Town in the play-off semi-finals. He signed a new one-year contract in May 2018. He scored seven goals in 45 appearances during the 2018–19 season, helping Mark Molesley's side to win promotion as champions. He scored one goals in 22 appearances in the 2019–20 National League South season, which was permanently suspended on 26 March due to the COVID-19 pandemic in England, with Weymouth in the play-offs in third-place. Weymouth went on to secure promotion after beating Dartford on penalties in the play-off final; Zubar was an unused substitute in the game. He announced his retirement on 17 September 2020. However, two days later he signed for Gosport Borough. On 2 October 2020, he joined Southern League Division One South club A.F.C. Totton. He made seven appearances before the 2020–21 season was curtailed early due to the ongoing pandemic. He signed on for the 2021–22 season, and played nineteen games, though was not in a matchday squad after December.

International career
Zubar made his international debut for Guadeloupe at the 2011 CONCACAF Gold Cup. He played in the 1–0 defeats to Canada and eventual runners-up the United States.

Style of play
Zubar was a pacey and strong defender, able to play at centre-back and right-back. Speaking in February 2012, Bournemouth manager Lee Bradbury stated that Zubar "works very hard, is really passionate about the game and is a deep thinker".

Personal life
He is the younger brother of Ronald Zubar and cousin of Claude Dielna, both of whom are footballers.

Career statistics

Club

International
Source:

Honours
Weymouth
Southern Football League Premier Division South: 2018–19
National League South play-offs: 2020

References

1986 births
Living people
People from Pointe-à-Pitre
Guadeloupean footballers
Guadeloupe international footballers
Association football defenders
Stade Malherbe Caen players
Pau FC players
R.W.D.M. Brussels F.C. players
FC Vaslui players
Plymouth Argyle F.C. players
AFC Bournemouth players
Bury F.C. players
Port Vale F.C. players
York City F.C. players
Weymouth F.C. players
Yeovil Town F.C. players
Gosport Borough F.C. players
A.F.C. Totton players
Championnat National 2 players
Championnat National players
Belgian Pro League players
Liga I players
English Football League players
Southern Football League players
National League (English football) players
2011 CONCACAF Gold Cup players
Guadeloupean expatriate footballers
Expatriate footballers in Belgium
Expatriate footballers in England
Expatriate footballers in Romania